Eunicella verrucosa, the broad sea fan, pink sea fan or warty gorgonian, is a species of colonial Gorgonian "soft coral" in the family Gorgoniidae. It is native to the north-eastern Atlantic Ocean and the western Mediterranean Sea.

Description
Eunicella verrucosa has a densely branching, fan-like stem and usually grows in a single plane. Stems and branches are covered with wart-like growths from which the polyps protrude. The colour can vary from red, through pink to white.

Distribution
Eunicella verrucosa is native to the northeastern Atlantic and the western Mediterranean Sea. Its range extends from the southwestern coasts of Britain and Ireland to France, Spain, Italy, Algeria, Morocco, Western Sahara and Mauritania. A recent study of genetic connectivity in Eunicella verrucosa identified marked population structure between samples from northwest Ireland, Britain, France and southern Portugal. In British waters this sea fan has become scarcer, possibly being damaged by dredging but may benefit from higher seawater temperatures.

Biology
Eunicella verrucosa is usually orientated at right angles to the direction of water flow across the colony. The polyps expand and spread out their tentacles to feed. The nutrients are passed to other parts of the colony through the internal channels connecting the polyps.

Reproduction in Eunicella verrucosa has been little studied. The planula larvae are likely to be lecithotrophic (sustained by a yolk-sac) and able to drift for a short time before settling on the seabed where they develop into polyps and found new colonies. The sea fan anemone (Amphianthus dohrnii) is often found living on Eunicella verrucosa.

References

External links 

 Marine Life Encyclopaedia
 Image of a broad sea fan
 Pink sea fan conservation in the UK
 

Gorgoniidae
Cnidarians of the Atlantic Ocean
Fauna of the Mediterranean Sea
Anthozoa of North Africa
Anthozoa of Europe
Invertebrates of Africa
Invertebrates of Europe
Corals described in 1766
Taxa named by Peter Simon Pallas
Taxonomy articles created by Polbot